Wired was a Belgian annual demoparty which ran from 1994 to 1998. Typical competitions included PC and Amiga demos and intros, handmade and ray traced graphics, music and surprise competitions (where theme and rules are announced around two hours prior the deadline).

History 

The first edition took place at the Université de Mons-Hainaut in Mons from 29 to 31 October 1994. It was organized by Antares and Babylon 5. Ten demos entered the PC competition but only two Amiga productions were presented. Necronomicon by Imagine won the PC competition. Unusually for a demoparty, a Doom tournament was held at Wired '94.

One year later, Wired '95 was held from 3–5 November 1995 at the same place and organized by Antares, Imphobia and TFL-TDV. This time, no more Amiga competitions were held, Wired became a PC only party, but additional categories were introduced: 4k intro (which previously occurred as a surprise competition only) and ANSI. The PC demo section saw 17 entries and the victory of Valhalla with Soltice. Another remarkable production was the 64k intro winner: Magic Carpet by Keen Like Frogs. This group managed to code an engine similar to the one used Magic Carpet in 64 kilobytes only, complete with textures and music. A French TV channel also chose this event to record a report on demoscene.

For its '96 edition, which took place from 1–3 November 1996, the place changed to a sport-hall in Wasmes, a little town near Mons.  Organizers were Imphobia and Antares.
In this new location, the event gathered about 600 demosceners from all over Europe. Again, the 64k intro competition revealed a ground breaking production: Paper by Psychic Link & ACME; this prefigured an effect that would become known as cellshading. This edition introduced the Coca-Cola drinking contest, where each contestant would have to drink a 1.5 L bottle as fast as possible. 

In 1997, the place stayed the same but the party date moved from winter to summer (being held on 18–20 July). Imphobia was joined by Bomb, Pulpe, Smash Designs and W.O.W. in its organizing efforts. This edition marked the return of Amiga and even C-64 competitions. The winning PC 64k intro stand out again. This time, it was Jizz by The Black Lotus introducing the generated objects and textures system to the PC world. The Magic Carpet engine was coded in 4k this time by Dawn of a New Age. For the first time, a 100kb PC game competition was held.

Wired '98 took place on 17–19 July 1998 and attracted 800 attenders. Organizing team was composed of Imphobia, Melting Pot, Pulpe, W.O.W. and Role. Since it was announced as the final edition, a very strange atmosphere overwhelmed the party mood. Only a few Amiga productions showed up. The PC demo competition was won by Cocoon with the heavy Syndrome demo, and the PC 64K intro competition was won by Quad with Theta.

Future 

A Wired was to be held in Brussels in 2000, but the idea was eventually dropped.

A demoparty called Rewired was planned for 2008 in Belgium, but there is no link with the original Wired (a different place, different organizers and a much smaller capacity of 250 people).

References

External links
 Wired '94 report by Sleeping Dog / The Natives
 Wired demoparties results, reports and productions download

Demo parties
Entertainment events in Belgium
Recurring events established in 1994